The 2008 All-Australian team represents the best performed Australian Football League (AFL) players during the 2008 season. The selection panel provided the 40 leading players of the year in their playing positions at the conclusion of the home and away season before announcing the final 22 during the All-Australian Presentation Dinner on 15 September. The team is honorary and does not play any games.

Selection panel
The selection panel for the 2008 All-Australian team consisted of non-voting chairman Andrew Demetriou, Adrian Anderson, Robert Walls, Gerard Healy, Mark Bickley, Glen Jakovich, Rod Austin and Kevin Bartlett.

Team

Initial squad
The 40-man squad was announced on 3 September, with ten  players named.

Final team

Note: the position of coach in the All-Australian team is traditionally awarded to the coach of the premiership team.

The 2008 All-Australian umpire was also awarded, with that honour going to Brett Rosebury.

References

All-Australian Team, 2008
All-Australian team